Hive is a fictional supervillain appearing in American comic books published by Marvel Comics. Hive was an experiment made to physically embody the ideals of the fictional terrorist group HYDRA. The entity is composed of untold numbers of genetically-engineered parasites.

Hive appeared in the third season of the TV series Agents of S.H.I.E.L.D. where he was an ancient Inhuman and was primarily portrayed by Brett Dalton.

Publication history
Hive first appeared in Secret Warriors #2 (May 2009) and was created by Brian Michael Bendis and Alex Maleev.

Fictional character biography
The Hive was created in the HYDRA laboratories at their home base of Gehenna. An unknown and unwitting HYDRA agent was offered and fed to these parasites as a host around which they could merge into a singular being. Grotesque and menacing in both stature and appearance, the Hive had no identity of its own, per se - as its collective will dominate the human host it engulfs. However, it possesses a quiet and cunning intelligence and as a result of its conditioning is completely dedicated to the HYDRA cause to the extent that Baron Strucker appointed it as a figurehead alongside himself, the Viper, Gorgon, Kraken, and the new Madame HYDRA in the form of triple agent Valentina Allegra de Fontaine.

When HYDRA went to war against the rival organization Leviathan, Valentina revealed her true allegiance and murdered her predecessor Viper. When Strucker and the other heads discovered Viper's corpse, the Hive shocked and appalled them all by merging with the deceased woman's body, re-animating Viper, but with the parasites themselves gathering into a bulbous mass atop her head with four prehensile tentacles.

Nick Fury has one of his teams led by his son Mikel Fury sent to destroy the Hive Base located in the Indian Ocean. The team is attacked by hundreds of HYDRA agents being controlled by Hive itself. The team is overrun, but not before sacrificing themselves to blow up the base presumably killing Hive.

Taking back her title as Madame HYDRA, Viper and Gorgon subsequently broke away from Baron Strucker's weakening grip on HYDRA and formed an alliance with Norman Osborn's H.A.M.M.E.R. organization. During this brief and fragile union, Osborn arranged for Madame HYDRA to undergo surgery to remove the Hive from her in a way that would keep her alive.

Hive is later found alive in a HYDRA-decorated crypt in Egypt by the new Madame HYDRA in her bid to form a new HYDRA High Council to assist Steve Rogers, whom had his history altered to be a HYDRA sleeper agent for years by Red Skull's clone using the powers of Kobik.

During the Secret Empire storyline, Hive is shown to have taken control of the Hand when the Underground encounters him and Gorgon in Madripoor. Hive is defeated by the Tony Stark A.I.

Powers and abilities
The Hive's body, while bipedal, is not a solid figure but a writhing congregation of its many parasites. As such, these parasites can actually latch away from the mass and attack others at high speed—making them effective projectile weapons. As one, the Hive is capable of asserting itself as an individual, albeit without name or personality. In this form it is capable of speech—the language, however, is unknown, though spoken also by other HYDRA agents—suggesting it is one of their own design, created for strategic secrecy when in the field. The Hive is capable of breathing both on land and underwater.

Hive's strength level is never revealed but it is implied that the Hive possesses a greater than average physical strength from the combined efforts of its parasites. The Hive's only weakness is that despite the deadliness of its parasites it still has the physical limitations of its human host; in other words, whilst it can improve upon the host's strength and skills it cannot perform impossibilities such as flight if the host cannot. Also, any ailments afflicting the host prior to absorption will still be present and will affect the Hive—for instance, its original human host possessed a minute blood disorder and was also a diabetic—hence, why the HYDRA heads deemed him as fodder for the Hive experiment and would have also made him weak enough to be absorbed. These maladies would have also been present within the Hive afterwards. When the Hive later merged with the Viper, these ailments would no longer be present.

In other media

An Inhuman version of Hive, also known as Alveus, appears as the main antagonist in season 3 of Agents of S.H.I.E.L.D. Originally a Maya warrior in ancient times (portrayed by Jason Glover), he was captured by the Kree Reapers and became one of their first subjects to undergo Terrigenesis, a process used to create super soldiers known as Inhumans. Terrigenesis transforms him into a mass of cellular parasites which survives by inhabiting a dead human host, gaining their memories in the process, and he can manifest an alien-like head with protruding tentacles. Hive can expel the parasites to devour humans for nourishment, or infect Inhumans to "sway" them under his control in a hive mind. The ancient Inhumans feared him and used Kree technology to banish him to a faraway planet called Maveth. His remaining worshipers established a secret society to prepare the world for his return (ultimately evolving into the terrorist organization HYDRA) and provide new victims/hosts, including Lord Manzini (portrayed by Daniel J. Wolfe), Nathaniel Malick (portrayed by Joel Courtney) and NASA astronaut Will Daniels (portrayed by Dillon Casey). Through HYDRA's efforts, Hive returns to Earth in the corpse of HYDRA leader Grant Ward (portrayed by Brett Dalton). Hive seizes control of HYDRA and recreates the Terrigenesis experiment, seizing a warhead to spread worldwide a virus that transforms humans into Hive-infected primitive Inhuman warriors. His efforts are thwarted by S.H.I.E.L.D. when Lincoln Campbell entraps them both in a space bound Quinjet containing the exploding warhead, killing them both. In "The Real Deal", a fear manifestation of Hive is among the fear manifestations released when the Kree Beacon exploded near the three monoliths. It was destroyed by Phil Coulson and Deathlok.

References

 Secret Warriors #2-6, 12, 15, 16, 20, and 24, Marvel Comics.

External links
 Hive at Marvel Wiki
 Hive at Comic Vine
 Hive at Marvel Cinematic Universe Wiki

Characters created by Alex Maleev
Characters created by Brian Michael Bendis
Comics characters introduced in 2009
Hydra (comics) agents
Fictional mass murderers
Fictional hypnotists and indoctrinators
Fictional parasites and parasitoids
Marvel Comics television characters
Fictional genetically engineered characters